Formica paralugubris is a species of ant. It is a member of the Formica rufa species group native to the Alps in the Palearctic realm. It is a cryptic species, often miscategorized as Formica lugubris due to morphological similarities. The two species are capable of differentiating one another, however; F. paralugubris ants react aggressively towards F. lugubris ants.Formica paralugubris differs in its organization as a supercolony. It has been introduced into North America with the import of pine trees. It does not exhibit characteristics found in other invasive species due to its limited native range.

Ecology
Nestmates within a F. paralugubris colony can recognize each other. F. paralugubris worker ants are known to collect conifer resin and place near their brood; this resin contains antimicrobial properties that the ants often modify by releasing formic acid onto the resin. Formic acid in combination with resin has antifungal properties.

References

paralugubris
Insects described in 1996
Palearctic insects